The Netafim Border Crossing is a border crossing between Israel and Egypt. It is located adjacent to Highway 12, about 12 km north of Eilat, 1 km north west of Ein Netafim.
The control of the border crossing was handed over to the Israel Airports Authority in 1980; nowadays it is closed. Very seldom it is reopened under special circumstances.
There are plans to reopen the border crossing passage as alternative during festivals, in coordination with the Egyptian authorities.

The border line is guarded accurately on both sides, on the Israeli side alongside Highway 12 (one of the two accommodation roads to Eilat) by the Israel Border Police and on the Egyptian side from some army positions.

The border crossing is in the proximity of the Israel National Trail, but not exactly on the route, nevertheless many wanderers, who have lost their way, arrive at the border crossing to drink some water.

History
Today's border crossing sits at the eastern end of a mountain pass used by important roads throughout history. The medieval hajj road to Mecca coming from Egypt and the Maghreb passed through here, meeting with the one coming from Syria a little to the southeast, at the town of Aylah – modern-day Aqaba, the twin city of Eilat. The road coming from Egypt had to cross through a mountain pass in Sinai named either 'Aqabat Aylah ("the ascent of 'Aylah), Naqb al-'Aqabah ("the mountain pass of Aqaba") or Ras an-Naqb ("the head/promontory of the mountain pass"). Netafim/Ras an-Naqb keeps its strategic importance until today. The Egyptian military has a base at what is commonly spelled in Egypt as Ras El Naqb, and there is also an airport located there.

It should not be confused other sites of the same name, some not far away, such as the Jordanian Ras an-Naqb in the desert between Petra and Aqaba, and the Ras en Naqb village north of Beersheba fought over during World War I.

At the end of the 1948–49 Arab–Israeli War, in the last day of Operation Uvda on March 10, 1949, the Negev Brigade captured the abandoned position of the Jordanian Arab Legion in Ras al-Naqb (Hebrew ראס אל-נקב), exactly where the Netafim border crossing is located today.

During the Suez Crisis in 1956, Ras al-Naqb was again one of the strategic positions important for gaining control of the Sinai Peninsula.

References

External links
Israel Airport Authority

Egypt–Israel border crossings
Eilat